Northern Indiana is a region of the U.S. State of Indiana, including 26 counties which border the states of Illinois, Michigan, and Ohio. Northern Indiana is also considered part of the Great Lakes Megalopolis. The area is generally classified into other sub-regions; Northwest Indiana (or the Calumet Region) is closely tied with Chicago economically, culturally, and politically and is part of the Chicago metropolitan area. The north central region (or Michiana) centers on South Bend metropolitan area, with economic connections to southwest Michigan. Northeast Indiana is centered on the Fort Wayne metropolitan area.

The Northern Indiana landscape is physically characterized by very flat to very rolling terrain, ranging from 600 to 1,000 feet (180 to 300 m) above sea level. Glacial kettle lakes are found throughout Northeast Indiana, with sand dunes sharing the Lake Michigan shoreline with heavy industry in the northwest. Kosciusko County is home to the largest natural lake (Wawasee) and deepest natural lake (Tippecanoe) in the state of Indiana. The Eastern Continental Divide runs through the region following the top of the Valparaiso Moraine. Besides a few urban areas, much of Northern Indiana lies in the agricultural Corn Belt.

Northern Indiana is known for having the third-highest Amish population in the U.S., especially in Allen, Adams, Elkhart, and LaGrange counties.

Sub-regions

Calumet
The following counties are the Northwest Indiana counties that are part of the Chicago metropolitan area. Much of this area in Indiana is known as the Calumet Region.
 Lake County, Indiana
 Porter County, Indiana
 La Porte County, Indiana
 Newton County, Indiana
 Jasper County, Indiana

Michiana
The following counties are considered part of Michiana:
Elkhart County, Indiana
Fulton County, Indiana
Marshall County, Indiana
Pulaski County, Indiana
St. Joseph County, Indiana
Starke County, Indiana

Northeast Indiana
The 11 counties of northeast Indiana formed a regional partnership anchored by the state's second-largest city, Fort Wayne.
 Adams County, Indiana
 Allen County, Indiana
 DeKalb County, Indiana
 Huntington County, Indiana
 Kosciusko County, Indiana
 LaGrange County, Indiana
 Noble County, Indiana
 Steuben County, Indiana
 Wabash County, Indiana
 Wells County, Indiana
 Whitley County, Indiana

Other counties
Benton County, Indiana
Cass County, Indiana
Miami County, Indiana
White County, Indiana

Largest municipalities

The major cities of Northern Indiana are Fort Wayne (in the northeast), South Bend (in the north central region), and Hammond and Gary located in the extreme northwest along Lake Michigan.

Demographics

Northern Indiana has seen a steady population growth over the past century with the exception of 1990. Between 1980 and 1990, Lake County (which includes the city of Gary) saw a population decline of 47,371 residents, and it was this drop in population that hid the population rise which continued to occur in the majority of the region's other counties. The 2015 Census Estimate has shown that the rural counties (i.e., Wabash and Wells) are seeing a gradual population decline when compared to the gradual increase (or steady) population trend in the more urban counties (i.e., St. Joseph). The trend of rural counties losing population has been observed in various counties in other regions, most notably the Great Plains.

Roughly 10.7% of both Huntington and Wells County lives in poverty, as compared to only 15.5% in Pulaski County. At the same time, Northern Indiana, as is the case for much of the Midwest, is predominately made up of people of European heritage. According to the 2010 Census, almost 98% of Whitley County is white, as compared to Lake County (Gary), which is only 64.4% white and 25.9% African American. Lastly, the average family size per household is relatively constant around 3.00 persons per household. In 2010, the average family size per household was 3.66 in LaGrange County, 3.23 in Elkhart County, 3.19 in Lake County, 3.16 in Noble County, 3.15 in Marshall County and 3.12 in Allen County.

Dialect
The Inland North dialect of American English is mostly found in the Calumet region of Northern Indiana. The Northern cities vowel shift is recognizable in Northwest Indiana and the Michiana area. However, the rest of Northern Indiana tends to exhibit North Midland dialect, with little recognizable influences. Because of the city's transitional location between the Inland North, North Midland, and Central Midland dialects, Fort Wayne has been difficult for linguists to define, with some labeling speech here "virtually accent neutral," attributed to historical settlement patterns.

Time zones

The Calumet region observes Central Time, including Jasper, Lake, La Porte, Newton, Porter, and Starke counties. The rest of Northern Indiana observes Eastern Time.

Economy

Northern Indiana bases much of its economy around manufacturing, distribution and transportation, and medical devices. Outside the metropolitan areas, the region's agricultural sector is abundant, given its location within the Corn Belt. Despite the region's storied history in industry, Northern Indiana is also at the heart of the Rust Belt, an area of the U.S. that has suffered deindustrialization and some economic stagnation since the late-20th century.

The Calumet region of Northwest Indiana is home to much heavy industry, notably steel mills. The Calumet region is the nation's second-largest steel producing area. U.S. Steel's Gary Works (in Gary) was once the largest steel mill in the world and employed 30,000. Gary Works remains the largest integrated steel mill in North America. Operated by BP, the Whiting Refinery (in Whiting) is the fifth-largest oil refinery in the nation, processing  of crude oil daily. Northwest Indiana is also a vital trade and shipping center for the state. The Port of Indiana–Burns Harbor handles more ocean-going cargo than any other Great Lakes port in the U.S. Gambling is another important component to the Calumet region's economy, with five riverboat casinos on Lake Michigan (Ameristar, Blue Chip, Horseshoe, Majestic Star, and Majestic Star II).

The north central area of Northern Indiana, centered on Warsaw, is home to several companies specializing in the development and production of orthopaedic medical devices. Nearly one-third of the $38 billion global orthopaedic industry is concentrated in north central Indiana. Elkhart and surrounding municipalities in the Michiana region are home to the largest concentration of recreational vehicle and mobile home manufacturers in the U.S., including Forest River, Gulfstream Coach, Heartland Recreational Vehicles, Jayco, and Monaco Coach, among several others. Some 83 percent of American RVs are produced in Elkhart County.

Benton County is home to several wind farms, including the Benton County Wind Farm, Hoosier Wind Farm, Meadow Lake Wind Farm, and Fowler Ridge Wind Farm, the largest of its kind in the American Midwest and twelfth largest in the world.

 Companies headquartered in Northern Indiana:

Nature areas

Colleges and universities

Transportation

Interstates
 
 
 
 
 
 

US Highways

Mass transit

Airports
Primary
Fort Wayne International Airport
South Bend International Airport
Reliever
Griffith-Merrillville Airport
General aviation

Notable people

 Arnie Ball, volleyball coach and athletic administrator
 Lloy Ball, Arnie's son; Olympic gold medalist with Team USA in volleyball
 Otis R. Bowen, Governor of Indiana and U.S. Secretary of Health and Human Services
 Johnny Appleseed, missionary and American folk hero figure
James R. Clapper, current Director of National Intelligence
Schuyler Colfax, Speaker of the United States House of Representatives and U.S. Vice President
Ward Cunningham, computer programmer who developed the first wiki
 Skylar Diggins-Smith, current WNBA player
Philo T. Farnsworth, inventor of the modern television
Jim Gaffigan, stand-up comedian, actor, and author
Richard G. Hatcher, Mayor of Gary, first African American mayor of a U.S. city
Heather Headley, Tony and Grammy Award-winning Broadway actress and R&B singer
The Jackson family, pop recording artists
Shawn Kemp, former NBA's player
Carole Lombard, Academy Award-nominated actress
Shelley Long, Golden Globe and Emmy Award-winning actress
Karl Malden, Academy Award-winning actor
Thomas R. Marshall, U.S. Vice President
Hugh McCulloch, U.S. Secretary of the Treasury
Gregg Popovich, head coach for NBA's San Antonio Spurs, longest tenured coach in the Big Four sports leagues
Cole Porter, composer and songwriter
Dan Quayle, U.S. Senator and U.S. Vice President
Orville Redenbacher, businessman and popcorn mogul
John Roberts, current Chief Justice of the United States
Paul A. Samuelson, first American Nobel Prize in Economics recipient
Chris Schenkel, former Sportscaster for ABC Sports
Rod Woodson, former NFL player, analyst, and Pro Football Hall of Famer
Belle Gunness

See also

Geography of Indiana
Great Lakes Megalopolis

References

Further reading

Regions of Indiana